Ian McDonald (born 26 December 1958) is a Scottish former footballer who scored 32 goals from 386 appearances in the Scottish League playing for Partick Thistle, Motherwell, Stranraer and Greenock Morton. He played as a midfielder.

References

1958 births
Living people
Footballers from Glasgow
Scottish footballers
Association football midfielders
Partick Thistle F.C. players
Motherwell F.C. players
Stranraer F.C. players
Greenock Morton F.C. players
Scottish Football League players